Moanda is one of the largest towns in Gabon, lying on the N3 road in Haut Ogooué.  It is also one of the most important manganese mining towns in the world, under the auspices of the Compagnie Minière de l'Ogooué (COMILOG), which began mining in 1957. Moanda has a population of around 39,298 inhabitants (2010 est.)  and is the second largest city in the Haut Ogooué Region, after Franceville. It is also a border town, lying 100 km away from the border with the Republic of Congo.

History
Moanda was originally a village lying on the swampy banks of the Miosso River. The discovery and exploitation of manganese in the nearby Bangombe Plateau from 1953 led to the emergence of the city. In 1977 Moanda had an estimated 230 million tons of manganese, some one-fifth of the world's deposits. In 1959, the 75 km COMILOG Cableway to the railway at Mbinda in the Republic of Congo was constructed to export the manganese, but it was eventually closed in 1986 when the Trans-Gabon Railway was completed. The city further grew during the 1990s owing to an influx of refugees from then war-torn Republic of Congo.

Geography and climate
Moanda lies on several adjacent plateaus lying between the higher and larger Bangombe plateau in the north, and the Miosso swamp in the south. Rocky formations Mount Boundinga and Mount Moanda lie further south.

The climate is equatorial, with an alternation of thunderstorms and hot temperatures between January and March, and cool temperatures from July to September.

Divisions
Moanda is divided into three areas. The first area is built on the main plateau and its slopes and includes the commercial centre and populous districts Ankoula, Montagne Sainte and Fumier. The second area includes the most populous districts Alliance, Rio and L'Oasis.  The third area is on the easternmost plateau and includes Lekolo and Leyima. Another plateau is home to Rigobert Landji High School, the largest high school in the city. Other districts include the Third Zone in the southwest, and the Mukaba District, on the slopes of the Bangombe Plateau.

Economy

On 24 April 1953 a joint corporation was established to mine a deposit estimated at 50 million tons of manganese ore in Gabon owned by the Bureau of Mines of Overseas France (21%), Eastern Tjbangi Mining Company (15%), Société Mokta El Hadid (15%) and the U.S. Steel (49%).
A  railway had first to be built to the coast, so full production was not expected until at least 1960.
The Compagnie minière de l'Ogooué (Comilog) had initial capital of CFA 150 million.
The first ore was shipped from Moanda on 2 October 1962.
Moanda is now one of the largest manganese mining centres in the world.
The operating company, COMILOG, exports an average 3.5 million tons of manganese a year.
This makes Gabon one of the three largest manganese exporters in the world. The manganese so far is exploited on the Bangombe Plateau (42 km²).

Education

French international schools include:
Lycée Henri-Sylvoz
École primaire Comilog

Sport
The main stadium is Stade Henri Sylvoz, the home of AS Mangasport.

Transport
Moanda is served by Moanda Railway Station situated outside the city, north of the Bangombe Plateau. Moanda is also home to an airfield, and lies about 50 km to Mvengue Airport, none of which, as of 2016, had any commercial airline service. The city is crossed by the N3 road and is the northern end of the Moanda-Mbinda Road, which connects Moanda to Mbinda, Congo. Moanda Railway Station is the last stop before Franceville, the southern terminus of the Trans-Gabon Railway. The road to the Republic of Congo goes between Mount Moanda and Mount Boundinga.

See also 
 Muanda, Democratic Republic of the Congo
 Railway stations in Gabon

References 

Populated places in Haut-Ogooué Province